The Medal of Honor is the highest military decoration presented by the United States government to a member of its armed forces.  The attack on Pearl Harbor was a surprise military strike on the neutral United States by the Imperial Japanese Navy against numerous U.S. military sites on the island of Oahu – with a focus on the naval base at Pearl Harbor – in the U.S. Territory of Hawaii on the morning of December 7, 1941. The attack killed almost 2,500 people and devastated the U.S. naval fleet and airfields, leading to America's entry into World War II.

For their actions during the attack on Pearl Harbor, 15 sailors in the U.S. Navy (from seven ships and one Naval Air Station) were awarded the Medal of Honor. As noted below, a 16th Medal of Honor was awarded to a Marine for an encounter that day, at a Naval Air Station on Sand Island in the Hawaiian Islands, with units of the same Japanese attack fleet. The 16 recipients held a wide range of ranks, from seaman to rear admiral. Eleven (69%) received their awards posthumously.

Specific locations
Medals of Honor were awarded to four sailors from USS California, three from USS Arizona, two each from USS Nevada and USS Oklahoma, and one each from USS Utah, USS West Virginia, as well as one land based at Naval Air Station Kaneohe Bay and a marine based at Naval Air Station Midway,

Recipients

Midway
The Japanese fleet that attacked Pearl Harbor also struck elsewhere in the Hawaiian Islands that day, trying to disable the U.S. Marine base on Sand Island at Midway Atoll.  For his actions during that engagement, a 16th Medal of Honor was awarded to a Marine who died at Sand Island on this first day of the Pacific War.

See also
Francis P. Hammerberg - posthumous Navy Medal of Honor recipient for noncombat action (rescue operations) in the West Loch of Pearl Harbor in February 1945.

Medal of Honor recipients for Attack on Pearl Harbor
Pearl Harbor
Attack on Pearl Harbor
Medal of Honor